Mack William James (born February 11, 1950) is an American professional basketball player. He had played collegiately at Tyler Junior College and Marshall University before joining the Kentucky Colonels in the American Basketball Association in early January 1974. He appeared in one game for the Colonels before being waived at the end of the month to make room for rookie Jim Bradley.

References

1950 births
Living people
American men's basketball players
Basketball players from Indiana
Kentucky Colonels players
Marshall Thundering Herd men's basketball players
People from Scott County, Indiana
Point guards
Tyler Apaches men's basketball players